Matthew Montgomery (born Matthew Robert Ramírez; March 16, 1978) is an American actor, producer and writer born in Houston, Texas. Since his début in Gone, But Not Forgotten, he has specialized in independent movies with LGBT themes.

Early life 
Montgomery's father is of Mexican descent and his mother is of Ukrainian descent. He was born in Houston and grew up in Corpus Christi, where he became involved with the arts at a young age. His father was an artist and has a gallery where his friends, who were painters, actors, directors and writers would visit.

At the age of 11, Montgomery played his first role in theater in a school production of Charlotte's Web by E. B. White. In high school, he played his first lead role in  a production of Annie Get Your Gun by Irving Berlin.

His parents divorced when he was teenager, and his father remarried a few years later. His step-mother introduced Montgomery to classic cinema. His work is influenced by actors from the classical era.

Personal life 

Montgomery is openly gay, stating in an interview, that:

When I came to Los Angeles, I did not think movies did gays. Nevertheless, from my début I have been dedicated to the independent gay cinema. I feel very lucky of being able to make me a cinema being openly gay.

Matthew Montgomery  and his real-life partner Steve Callahan have played lead roles together in Rob Williams' film Role/Play. Montgomery accepted the Philadelphia QFest 2010 Artistic Achievement Award for Acting after the film. Montgomery and Callahan were married on March 21, 2015 after being together for more than 7 years.

Work

Filmography

References

External links 
 

1978 births
Male actors from Houston
American male film actors
American people of Mexican descent
American people of Ukrainian descent
American male television actors
American gay actors
LGBT Hispanic and Latino American people
LGBT producers
Living people